"Wavy" is a song by Kenyan-New Zealand reggae musician Muroki, released as a single in February 2021. The song was commercially successful in New Zealand, becoming platinum certified. In September 2021, Muroki released a Māori language version of the song, called "Rehurehu".

Background and composition

The song was inspired by Brazilian samba rhythms; taking the feel of a Brazilian fiesta and blending this with "funk and new school sounds". The song was written together with producer Djeisan Suskov, ans is inspired by experiences Muroki had at a music festival, expressing the "crazy visuals and feelings [he] was having there".

Release and promotion

"Wavy" was released as the lead single from Muroki's extended play Dawn in February 2021. He performed the song live for sessions for Radio New Zealand in June 2021,

Critical reception

Manning Patston of Happy Media called the song "infectious", and called the song's opening "the most body-friendly groove I've heard this year". He praised the song as feeling "effortless" despite being carefully arranged, and noted Muroki's talent as a musician.

Credits and personnel
Credits adapted from Tidal.

Muroki Mbote Wa Githinji – electric 6-string, songwriter, performer
Djeisan Suskov – engineer, mastering engineer, mixer, producer, songwriter

Charts

Certifications

Release history

References

2021 singles
2021 songs
New Zealand songs